Itezhi-Tezhi is a constituency of the National Assembly of Zambia. It covers the towns of Itezhi-Tezhi, Kaliwa, Mashie, Musungwa and Shezongo in Itezhi-Tezhi District of Southern Province.

List of MPs

References

Constituencies of the National Assembly of Zambia
1991 establishments in Zambia
Constituencies established in 1991